The Foyle Cup is a youth soccer tournament held every year in Derry City, County Londonderry, Northern Ireland. Along with the Milk Cup, which takes place around the same time, The Foyle Cup is one of Ireland and indeed Europe's premier youth tournaments.

History
The competition began in 1992 with only eight teams competing. It is seen as one of the most important and pivotal tournaments in Northern Ireland, as it presents an opportunity for the youth of Northern Ireland to show their abilities. Academy teams of such European clubs as Werder Bremen, IFK Göteborg and Ferencváros have participated in the tournament, along with teams from the U.S. and Canada in recent times. It is widely recognised as a tournament that launches the careers of young players aspiring to sign professional contracts. In 2003 former Republic of Ireland player and current Sunderland chairman, Niall Quinn launched the tournament. The 2006 competition was launched by Lawrie Sanchez. In June 2007, Foyle Cup chairman, Michael Hutton confirmed that the 2007 competition will feature special guest, Liverpool F.C. legend Phil Neal. The competition has been title sponsored by local businesses such as Football special cola and Hughes insurance.

Location
All Foyle Cup matches are played around County Londonderry and the surrounding area, including Letterkenny and Strabane. Final matches are played in The Brandywell Stadium, although, from time to time, it may vary.

Notable past participants
 K.S.C. Lokeren Oost-Vlaanderen
 Ottawa Fury FC
 AC Horsens
 Altrincham FC
 AFC Bournemouth
 Fulham F.C.
 Norwich City F.C.
 Port Vale F.C.
 Sheffield United F.C.
 Sheffield Wednesday F.C.
 Montpellier Hérault SC
 Arminia Bielefeld
 Werder Bremen
 Ferencváros
 Cherry Orchard F.C.
 Bohemians F.C.
 Derry City F.C.
 Finn Harps F.C.
 Letterkenny Rovers F.C.
 Brescia Calcio
 Armagh City F.C.
 Ballymena United F.C.
 Coleraine F.C.
 Glentoran F.C.
 Institute F.C.
 Linfield F.C.
 Aberdeen F.C.
 Celtic F.C.
 Heart of Midlothian F.C.
 Hibernian F.C.
 IFK Göteborg
Other regular teams to appear
 Derry and District League Youth Teams
 USL Youth teams

References

External links
Official Site
Foyle Cup Kicks off 2006

International association football competitions hosted by Northern Ireland
Youth football competitions
Youth association football in Northern Ireland